Collybolide is a chemical constituent of the Rhodocollybia maculata mushroom, a fungus that grows on rotting conifer wood. It is potentially a potent and selective K-opioid receptor agonist, like salvinorin A. No total syntheses of this compound have been reported, and research is inconclusive as to whether collybolide is a K-opioid receptor agonist, and it still remains unknown whether collybolide is a hallucinogen; however, anecdotal reports suggest it is possible.

If it is active in humans, collybolide will be the only non-salvinorin selective K-opioid receptor agonist psychedelic.

Research 
Gupta et al. found collybolide to exhibit biased K-opioid agonist activity. K-opioid receptor agonists are under research for their potential in addiction treatment: and along with an easily modifiable structure (in contrast to salvinorin A), collybolide has attracted attention for the development of next-generation K-opioid receptor agonist analgesics, antipruritics, and antidepressants.

However, this is contested by Shevick et al., who, after synthesizing collybolide, could not find K-opioid agonist activity of either enantiomer. Shevick et al. fault the 2016 assay and suggest: an unidentified contaminant in the C. maculata extract, degradation during storage, or degradation during handling, produced a derivative of collybolide that is the true, but still unknown K-opioid receptor agonist.

References 

3-Furyl compounds
Benzoate esters
Heterocyclic compounds with 3 rings
Lactones
Rhodocollybia